Fakhrabad-e Olya (also Romanized as Fakhrābād-e ‘Olyā and Fakhrābād ‘Olyā; also known as Fakhrābād, Fakhrābād-e Bālā, and Sar Darreh) is a village in Darreh Seydi Rural District, in the Central District of Borujerd County, Lorestan Province, Iran. At the 2006 census, its population was 67, in 17 families.

References 

Towns and villages in Borujerd County